First Bank & Trust (FB&T) was a community and commercial bank founded in Evanston, Illinois that was legally acquired by Chicago's Byline Bank in 2018. FB&T was originally founded in 1995 by Robert Yohanan, Howard Kain and James Lytle.

References 

Banks based in Illinois
Banks established in 1995
1995 establishments in Illinois
Companies based in Evanston, Illinois
Defunct banks of the United States